"Here I Am" is a song by German recording artist Alexander Klaws. The song was written and produced by John Reid and Yak Bondy for Klaws's second album Here I Am (2004). Released as the album's fourth and final single, it became a moderate success, reached number 19 on the German Singles Chart.

Formats and track listings

Charts

References

External links
  
 

2004 singles
2004 songs
Alexander Klaws songs
Songs written by Yak Bondy
Hansa Records singles